Hart & Cooley, Inc. is an HVAC manufacturing company with plants in the United States, Mexico, and Canada. Their slogan is "Install Confidence." The home office for Hart & Cooley is in Grand Rapids, Michigan. Hart & Cooley manufactures residential and commercial products including grilles, registers and diffusers, duct system components, flexible air duct, type-b gas vent, chimneys, chimney liners, roof flashings and access doors.

History
Howard Hart and Norman Cooley established the Hart & Cooley Manufacturing Company in New Britain, Connecticut in 1901. This new company became the first in the nation to manufacture warm-air registers from stamped steel. In the 1920s Hart & Cooley, Inc. made the move to Holland, Michigan, which would be the company's headquarters for almost 90 years.

During World War II, it became commonplace for many American companies to assist in production to help national efforts overseas. Hart & Cooley, Inc. ceased production of HVAC material in favor of electrical shipboard boxes and mortar shells. Production returned to normal by the end of the war.

In the second half of the century, Hart & Cooley expanded into many other products lines, including Type-B vent for gas-fired appliances, all-fuel chimney systems and flexible air ducting.  Hart & Cooley Inc. celebrated its centennial anniversary in June 2001, and 6 years later moved its headquarters to Grand Rapids, MI, 30 miles northeast of Holland.

Brands
Hart & Cooley, Inc. has acquired several brands in the last two decades, which include Selkirk, Portals Plus, Lima, Ward Industries, Roof Products and Systems, Milcor, and AMPCO. The Hart & Cooley logo in its present form  Was introduced in 2013, by then-President Michael C. Winn who initiated the major rebranding of the company. The new Hart & Cooley logo was designed by Graphic Designer John Scianna

Locations
Hart & Cooley, Inc. has distribution centers and manufacturing facilities across North America.

Manufacturing facilities 

 Huntsville, Alabama
 Mexicali, Mexico
 Nampa, Idaho
 Nobel, Ontario (Canada)
 Ojinaga, Mexico
 Olive Branch, Mississippi
 Sanger, California
 Turners Falls, Massachusetts

Distribution Centers

 Dallas, Texas
 Englewood, Ohio
 Huntsville, Alabama
 Mira Loma, California
 Prescott, Ontario (Canada)

References

Heating, ventilation, and air conditioning companies
Manufacturing companies based in Grand Rapids, Michigan
Manufacturing companies established in 1901
1901 establishments in Michigan